The Pratt–Smoot Act was passed by the United States Congress, and signed into law by President Herbert Hoover on March 3, 1931. It was introduced by Ruth Baker Pratt and Reed Smoot. J. Robert Atkinson, founder of the Braille Institute of America, was instrumental in getting the act passed through his lobbying efforts.

The act provided $100,000, to be administered by the Library of Congress, to provide blind adults with books.  The program, which is known as Books for the Blind, has been heavily amended and expanded over the years, and remains in place today.

References

External links
History of the program (with a state of Michigan emphasis): 

United States federal disability legislation
1931 in law
1931 in the United States